Jerome Francis Siebert (October 6, 1938 – December 30, 2022) was an American middle-distance runner. He competed in the 800 m at the 1960 and 1964 Olympics and finished in sixth place in 1964. In 1958 and 1960 he was part of the American relay teams that set world records in the 4×880 yd relay.

Siebert died in Golden, Colorado on December 30, 2022, at the age of 84.

References

External links
 

1938 births
2022 deaths
American male middle-distance runners
Athletes (track and field) at the 1960 Summer Olympics
Athletes (track and field) at the 1964 Summer Olympics
California Golden Bears men's track and field athletes
Olympic track and field athletes of the United States
Track and field athletes from California